The Bluegrass Stakes is a  Standardbred harness race for two-year-old colt and gelding trotters run annually over The Red Mile at Lexington, Kentucky. Due to a large number of entrants, the 2016 race was divided into five divisions, each with a purse of $66,000.

There is also a Bluegrass Stakes for two-year-old trotting fillies.

References

Recurring sporting events established in 1975
Harness races in the United States
Sports in Lexington, Kentucky